Tunxi District is the central district of Huangshan City, Anhui Province, eastern People's Republic of China.
 

Tunxi District has jurisdiction over four subdistricts and five towns.

The most well-known tourist spot is the Old Town, although Tunxi is also close to the Huangshan Mountain Range and Hongcun Village, both of which are World Heritage Sites.

Administrative divisions
Tunxi District is divided to 4 Subdistricts and 5 towns.
Subdistricts

Towns

Religion 
Tunxi (or Tunki) is the seat of the Latin Catholic Apostolic prefecture (a pre-diocesan jurisdiction, not entitled to a Titular Bishop) of Tunxi / Tunkien(sis) (Latin adjective), which depends on the missionary Roman Congregation for the Evangelization of Peoples. It was established on 1937.02.22 on territory split off from the then Apostolic Vicariate of Wuhu (now a Diocese). No statistics available. It has been vacant indefinitely without Apostolic administrator (possibly dormant) since the death of its only incumbent:
 Father José Fogued y Gil, Claretians (C.M.F.) (born in Spain) (1937.04.24 – death 1954.01.24).

Transportation

Roads and expressways 
 G56 Hangzhou–Ruili Expressway
 G3 Beijing–Taipei Expressway
 China National Highway 205

Railway 
Huangshan North railway station on 
 Hefei–Fuzhou high-speed railway
 Hangzhou–Huangshan intercity railway
 Huangshan railway station on
 Anhui–Jiangxi railway

Airport 
 Huangshan Tunxi International Airport

See also 
 List of Catholic dioceses in China

Sources and external links 
 GCatholic - Apostolic prefecture

Specific

County-level divisions of Anhui
Huangshan City